Hilton Izmir is a hotel in İzmir, Turkey, near the Old Town. The hotel tower has 33 floors with a panoramic restaurant at the top, and has a structural height of 142 metres (466 ft.). Upon its completion in 1992, Hilton Izmir became the tallest building in the city, and the third tallest building in Turkey after the 52-floor Mertim Tower (1987) in Mersin, and the 29-floor (including the spire) Sheraton Ankara (1991) in Ankara. Hilton Izmir remained as the tallest building in İzmir and the Aegean Region until 2014, when the 47-floor Folkart Twin Towers were completed. The hotel is an hour of driving distance from Ephesus, the well-preserved ancient Ionian and Roman city.

The hotel has been nominated for the Leading Conference Hotel in Turkey award by the World Travel Awards.

Hilton Izmir permanently closed its doors on October 16th, 2020

References

External links
 Hilton Izmir

Hotels in İzmir
Hotels established in 1992
Izmir
Skyscrapers in Turkey
Konak District
Modernist architecture in Turkey
1992 establishments in Turkey
Defunct hotels